Infectious Disease Clinics of North America is a medical journal that covers the latest trends in the clinical diagnosis and management of patients with infectious diseases. The journal is published by Elsevier.

Abstracting and indexing 
The journal is abstracted and indexed in:

 Embase
 PubMed/Medline
 CINAHL
 Current Contents - Clinical Medicine
 Web of Science
 Science Citation Index
 Medical Documentation Service
 Research Alert

According to the Journal Citation Reports, the journal has a 2021 impact factor of 5.982.

References

External links 
 
Elsevier academic journals
English-language journals
Microbiology journals
ISSN needed
Publications with year of establishment missing